Tezerj or Tazarj or Tezarj may refer to:
 Tezerj, Hormozgan
 Tezerj, Rabor, Kerman Province
 Tezerj, Shahr-e Babak, Kerman Province
 Tezerj, Sirjan, Kerman Province
 Tezerj, Jorjafak, Zarand County, Kerman Province
 Tezerj, Sarbanan, Zarand County, Kerman Province